The Jeffries House is a historic house at 415 Skyline Drive in North Little Rock, Arkansas.  It is a -story wood-frame structure, finished in a fieldstone veneer, and is three bays wide, with a side-gable roof, end chimneys, and symmetrical single-story wings at the sides.  The house is distinctive as a fine example of Colonial Revival architecture, rendered in the unusual veneered stone finish.  Built in 1931 by the Justin Matthews Company, it was the last house Matthews built in the Edgemont subdivision before the Great Depression brought the development to an end.

The house was listed on the National Register of Historic Places in 1992.

See also
National Register of Historic Places listings in Pulaski County, Arkansas

References

Houses on the National Register of Historic Places in Arkansas
Colonial Revival architecture in Arkansas
Houses completed in 1928
Houses in North Little Rock, Arkansas
National Register of Historic Places in Pulaski County, Arkansas